Thonigala Rock Inscriptions are two inscriptions engraved on a rock situated in Anamaduwa, in Sri Lanka. Each inscription is about 100 feet long and each letter is about one feet in height and engraved about one inch deep in to the rock. Also it is said to be the largest rock inscription found in Sri Lanka.

History
Thonigala rock inscriptions are dated back to the first century BC to the period of King Mahaculi Mahathissa (76-62 BC), who was a son of King Walagamba. The inscriptions reveal details about a grant of a lake and village to a Buddhist Monastery named Achagirika Tissa Pabbata.

Folklore
There is folklore that describe how the name of Thonigala formed. The most popular story is associated with Kuveni, the first consort of King Vijaya. According to the story, Vijaya had to marry a princess from India in order to become the king of his new found kingdom (Sri Lanka) and therefore, a Madras princess was brought down to Sri Lanka while expelling Kuweni and her children from the palace. Mourned by this unfair treatment, Kuweni fled to her home area and she cursed Vijaya from top of a rock called Lathonigala. It is said that the Lathonigala was this place called as Thonigala.

Contents

Inscription no. 1

Inscription no. 2

See also
 List of Archaeological Protected Monuments in Sri Lanka

References

Sri Lanka inscriptions
Anuradhapura period
Tourist attractions in North Western Province, Sri Lanka
Archaeological protected monuments in Puttalam District